Bernard Mendy (born 20 August 1981) is a French former professional footballer who played as a right-back. He was known for his blistering pace and constant overlapping runs. He most recently served as the assistant manager of Paris Saint-Germain Féminine.

Having started his professional career with Caen in the 1998–99 season, Mendy moved to Paris Saint-Germain in 2000 where his eight-year was only interrupted by a season-long loan at Bolton Wanderers. He went on to play for Hull City and OB before returning to France joining Brest in 2012. Later in his career, he had stints with Indian clubs Chennaiyin FC and East Bengal FC as well as with Cypriot side AEL Limassol.

Early life
Bernard Mendy was born on 20 August 1981 in Évreux, Eure.

Playing career
A fan of Paris Saint-Germain since his childhood, Mendy achieved his ambitions in 2000 when he joined PSG from SM Caen. Even though he had impressed a lot of people by his qualities during his first two seasons at PSG, he was loaned to Bolton Wanderers of England for a year, where he was appreciated for his offensive and speedy style. The new manager of PSG, Vahid Halilhodzic, decided to give him an opportunity to assert himself by using him as a first choice. That year, Mendy played one of his best seasons and was rewarded by playing his first match with the France national team against Brazil. However, he was not selected for the country's 2006 FIFA World Cup roster. In 2008, he came on as a substitute and scored the decisive goal in the final of the Coupe de la Ligue against RC Lens in a 2–1 victory, calmly stroking the ball home from the penalty spot.

Mendy had stated his desire to return to England, to play for his favourite football club, Manchester United. Instead, on 20 June 2008, it was reported by BBC Radio Humberside that Hull City had offered Mendy a three-year deal to join the newly promoted English club. He accepted the offer and joined Hull City for training in Italy. Hull manager Phil Brown had been assistant manager at Bolton during Mendy's time there. He scored his first goal for Hull City, a lob against Manchester United, in a game they lost 4–3. He was released from his contract on 17 May 2010.

On 9 February 2011, Mendy signed a -year contract with Danish club Odense Boldklub having passed the medical examination. On 25 June 2012, Mendy returned to playing in the French league by signing a two-year contract for Stade Brestois on a free transfer.

On 21 August 2014, Mendy was a first round pick in the Inaugural ISL International Draft, signing for the Chennaiyin FC. He started in their first match on 15 October, a 2–1 win at FC Goa.

On 12 January 2016, Mendy signed to play for the I-League side East Bengal in the 2015–16 season.

For the 2016 ISL season, he returned to Chennaiyin for one final season, playing 9 games and scoring twice as Chennaiyin had a disappointing season, finishing 7th in the points table. He decided to end his career at the end of the 2016 ISL season.

Coaching career
Mendy was appointed as assistant manager of Paris Saint-Germain Féminine in December 2017. With manager Patrice Lair joining Chamois Niortais prior to the final of 2017–18 Coupe de France féminine, Mendy took over as caretaker manager and led his side to a 1–0 victory against six-time defending champions Lyon. It was also second major title in team's history after the cup victory in 2010. He continues in his role of assistant manager after the appointment of Olivier Echouafni as manager.

Personal life
Mendy is married to former gymnast Lucy Hughes and has three daughters, Kayna, Iman and his third daughter was born in June 2010.

Career statistics

Club

Honours
Paris Saint-Germain
Coupe de France: 2003–04, 2005–06
Coupe de la Ligue: 2007–08
UEFA Intertoto Cup: 2001

Chennaiyin
Indian Super League: 2015

France U18
UEFA European Under-18 Championship: 2000

Individual
UNFP Team of the Year: 2003–04

References

External links

1981 births
Living people
Sportspeople from Évreux
Footballers from Normandy
French footballers
Association football defenders
Stade Malherbe Caen players
Paris Saint-Germain F.C. players
Bolton Wanderers F.C. players
Hull City A.F.C. players
Odense Boldklub players
Stade Brestois 29 players
Chennaiyin FC players
AEL Limassol players
East Bengal Club players
Premier League players
Ligue 1 players
Ligue 2 players
Danish Superliga players
Indian Super League players
Cypriot First Division players
France youth international footballers
France international footballers
French expatriate footballers
Expatriate footballers in Cyprus
Expatriate men's footballers in Denmark
Expatriate footballers in England
Expatriate footballers in India
French expatriate sportspeople in Cyprus
French expatriate sportspeople in Denmark
French expatriate sportspeople in England
French expatriate sportspeople in India